James Middleton (born 1987) is a British businessman and brother of Catherine, Princess of Wales.

James Middleton may also refer to:

Sports
 Bonnor Middleton (James Middleton, 1865–1913), South African cricketer
 Jim Middleton (baseball) (1889–1974), American baseball player
 Jimmy Middleton (footballer) (1922–1997), Scottish footballer
 Jim Middleton (footballer) (fl. 1960), New Zealand footballer
 Khris Middleton (James Khristian Middleton, born 1991), American basketball player

Others
 James Taylor Middleton (1840–1926), Ontario businessman and political figure
 James Middleton (political organiser) (1878–1962), General Secretary of the British Labour Party
 Jim Middleton (journalist), Australian television journalist

See also 
 Middleton (name)